Leandro Denis "Tati" Mercado (born 15 February 1992) is a motorcycle racer from Argentina who competed in the 2022 Superbike World Championship aboard a Honda CBR1000RR for Team MIE Racing. He is best known for winning the National title of the AMA Supersport Championship in 2009 and the FIM Superstock 1000 Cup in 2014.

Career

Junior career
After finishing third in the Red Bull AMA Rookies Cup in 2008, the following year Mercado achieved the same result in the East division of the AMA Supersport Championship and won the National title in the Shootout race held in Daytona. In 2010 he was seventh in the CIV Stock 600 Championship and contested three races of the European Superstock 600 Championship on a Kawasaki ZX-6R, while in 2011 he finished sixth in the CIV Stock 1000 Championship and sixteenth in the FIM Superstock 1000 Cup on a Kawasaki ZX-10R.

Superstock and Superbike World Championship
In 2012 Mercado raced in the Superbike World Championship for eight rounds in the first half of the season, before moving back to the FIM Superstock 1000 Cup. He was twenty-sixth and fifteenth respectively in the standings. For the following two seasons, he continued competing in the Superstock category, finishing fourth in 2013 with Kawasaki machinery, and winning the 2014 title on a Ducati 1199. 

For 2015, he returned to the Superbike World Championship full time, finishing eighth in the final standings. In 2016 he once again returned to the Superstock category, where he finished as runner-up. In 2017, he would ride for IodaRacing Project on an Aprilia RSV4 in the Superbike championship, finishing 13th in the championship, with 115 points.

Mercado switched to Kawasaki for the 2018 Superbike World Championship, riding the Kawasaki Ninja ZX-10R, but only finished 15th at the end of the season, with 70 points. He would stay with Kawasaki for 2019, but the results would remain the same, 80 points and 16th in the standings at the end of the year.

For the 2020 Superbike World Championship, Mercado switched to a Ducati, riding for Motocorsa Racing team, on a Ducati Panigale V4. After missing the opening rounds in Australia, Mercado was also forced to miss time in the middle of the season due to injuries, missing 10 races altogether, and therefore only finished 16th at the end of the year, with 24 points. In 2021, Mercado would switch teams again, this time riding a Honda CBR1000RR, for MIE Racing Honda Team. Once again, injuries plagued Mercado's season, as well as a covid-19 absence from the Czech weekend, leading to a career-low 26 points from him in the season, and 21st in the standings. Nevertheless, Honda announced that he would stay for 2022, partnered by Hafizh Syahrin.

In 2023, Mercado was without a ride so he joined the german IDM Superbike series.

Career statistics

Superbike World Championship

Races by year
(key) (Races in bold indicate pole position; races in italics indicate fastest lap)

 Season still in progress.

References

External links

1992 births
Living people
Argentine motorcycle racers
Superbike World Championship riders
FIM Superstock 1000 Cup riders
AMA Supersport Championship riders